Anatoly Ivanovich Larkin (October 14, 1932 – August 4, 2005) was a Russian theoretical physicist, universally recognised as a leader in theory of condensed matter, and who was also a celebrated teacher of several generations of theorists.

Born in a small town of Kolomna in Moscow region, Larkin went on to receive his education at the Moscow Engineering Physics Institute. He worked on his PhD on the properties of plasmas under the supervision of A.B.Migdal and later received the degree of Doctor of Science (1965) for studies of superconductivity.

Research at the I.V. Kurchatov Institute in Moscow (1957–66) was followed by nearly 40 years of work at the L.D.Landau Institute for Theoretical Physics in Chernogolovka, Moscow region, where he moved in 1966. During 1970–1991, he was also a professor at Moscow State University.  Since 1995, Larkin was a professor of physics at the University of Minnesota and a member of William I. Fine Theoretical Physics Institute.

The list of his publications (233 entries) consists of papers on condensed matter theory, theory of elementary particles, and nuclei and plasmas. 
Citation index of publications by A. Larkin exceeds 14,000.

The dominant part of his work is devoted to superconductivity, magnetism, ferro-electricity, properties of metals, semiconductors and dielectrics. 
He pioneered the concept of spontaneous symmetry breaking in the physics of elementary particles, 
discovered collective pinning of magnetic flux in superconductors, 
predicted paraconductivity 
and effects of fluctuations on properties of superconductors,
made essential contributions to the theory of weak localization, 
as well as developed the concept of the Ehrenfest time 
and its effect on phenomena of quantum chaos.

A.I. Larkin was the famous teacher of a large number of actively working theorists. His students and collaborators are teaching and conducting research in Russia, USA, Great Britain, France, Italy, Germany, Switzerland, Israel and other countries.

He died suddenly at 6pm on August 4, 2005, in Aspen, Colorado, where he was attending a physics workshop.

See also
Fulde–Ferrell–Larkin–Ovchinnikov phase
Nambu–Jona-Lasinio model

Honors and prizes
 London Prize in Low Temperature Physics (1990)
 Lars Onsager Prize (2002)
 Bardeen Prize (2004)
 Hewlett Packard Europhysics Prize (1993)
 Alexander von Humboldt Medal (1993)
 Award of Excellence of the World Congress on Superconductivity (1994)
 Member of Russian Academy of Sciences (1991), corresponding member of the USSR Academy of Sciences (1979)

Selected publications

A. Larkin, A. Varlamov, Theory of fluctuations in superconductors, Oxford University Press, 2005, xviii, 412 pp.  [International Series of Monographs on Physics 127]
 V. M. Galitski, A. I. Larkin, Superconducting fluctuations at low temperature, Physical Review B 63 (17), 174506 (2001)
 I. L. Aleiner, A. I. Larkin, Role of divergence of classical trajectories in quantum chaos, Phys. Rev. E 55 (2), R1243-R1246 (1997)
 L. B. Ioffe and A. I. Larkin, Gapless fermions and gauge fields in dielectrics, Phys. Rev. B 39, 8988 (1989)
 A. L. Larkin, Yu.N. Ovchinnikov, Quantum tunneling with dissipation, JETP Lett., 37 (7), 382-385 (1983); Pis’ma v ZhETF, 37 (7), 322-325 (1983)
S. Hikami, A.I. Larkin, Y. Nagaoka, Spin-Orbit Interaction and Magnetoresistance in the Two Dimensional Random System, Prog. Theor. Phys., 63(2), 707-710 (1980)
A.I. Larkin, Effect of inhomogeneities on the structure of the mixed state of superconductors, Sov. Phys. JETP 31(4), 784 (1970); (RUS) ZhETF, 58 (4), 1466-1470 (1970)
A.I. Larkin, D.E. Khmel’nitskii, Phase Transition in Uniaxial Ferroelectrics, Sov. Phys. JETP 29(6), 1123-1128 (1969); (RUS) ZhETF, 56 (6), 2087-2098 (1969)
L.G. Aslamazov, A.I. Larkin, Effect of Fluctuations on the Properties of a Superconductor Above the Critical Temperature, Sov. Phys. Solid State, 10(4), 875-880 (1968); (RUS) Fizika Tverd. tela, 10 (4), 1104-1111 (1968) 
A.I. Larkin, Yu.N. Ovchinnikov, Nonuniform state of superconductors, Sov. Phys. JETP 20, 762 (1965); (RUS) ZhETF, 47(3), 1136-1146 (1964)
V.G. Vaks, A.I. Larkin, On the application of the methods of superconductivity theory to the problem of the masses of elementary particles, Sov. Phys. JETP 13, 192-193 (1961); (RUS) ZhETF, 40(1), 282-285 (1961)
A.A. Vedenov, A.I. Larkin, Equation of state of plasma, Sov. Phys. JETP 9, 806-821 (1959); (RUS) ZhETF, 36(4), 1133-1142 (1959)

Notes

External links
Larkin's page at the University of Minnesota
Larkin memorial conference

Russian physicists
Russian nuclear physicists
Soviet physicists
20th-century American physicists
Soviet nuclear physicists
American nuclear physicists
Russian emigrants to the United States
Full Members of the Russian Academy of Sciences
1932 births
2005 deaths
Moscow Engineering Physics Institute alumni